Zabrotes is a genus of pea and bean weevils in the beetle family Chrysomelidae. There are more than 20 described species in Zabrotes.

Species
These 22 species belong to the genus Zabrotes:

 Zabrotes amplissimus Kingsolver, 1990
 Zabrotes arenarius (Wolcott, 1912)
 Zabrotes bexarensis Kingsolver, 1990
 Zabrotes chandleri Kingsolver, 1990
 Zabrotes chavesi Kingsolver, 1980
 Zabrotes cruciger Horn, 1885
 Zabrotes cynthiae Kingsolver, 1990
 Zabrotes densus Horn, 1885
 Zabrotes eldenensis Kingsolver, 1990
 Zabrotes guerrerensis Romero & Johnson
 Zabrotes humboldtae Kingsolver, 1990
 Zabrotes moctezuma Romero & Johnson
 Zabrotes obliteratus Horn, 1885
 Zabrotes planifrons Horn, 1885
 Zabrotes querrerensis Romero & Johnson
 Zabrotes sinaloensis Romero & Johnson
 Zabrotes spectabilis Horn, 1885
 Zabrotes stephani Kingsolver, 1990
 Zabrotes subfasciatus (Boheman, 1833) (Mexican bean weevil)
 Zabrotes subnitens (Horn, 1885)
 Zabrotes sylvestris Romero & Johnson, 1999
 Zabrotes victoriensis Kingsolver, 1990

References

External links

 

Bruchinae
Articles created by Qbugbot
Chrysomelidae genera